Nikolai Smirnov (born 27 February 1961 in Lviv) is a Ukrainian former water polo player who competed in the 1988 Summer Olympics.

See also
 List of Olympic medalists in water polo (men)
 List of world champions in men's water polo
 List of World Aquatics Championships medalists in water polo

References

External links
 

1961 births
Living people
Sportspeople from Lviv
Ukrainian male water polo players
Olympic water polo players of the Soviet Union
Water polo players at the 1988 Summer Olympics
Olympic bronze medalists for the Soviet Union
Olympic medalists in water polo
Soviet male water polo players
Medalists at the 1988 Summer Olympics